Pako Seribe (born 7 April 1991 in Gaborone) is a Botswana sprinter competing in the 200 and 400 metres. He represented his country at two consecutive World Championships, in 2011 and 2013.

His personal bests are 20.17 seconds in the 200 metres (Molepolole 2015) and 45.00 seconds in the 400 metres (Velenje 2015).

Competition record

References

1991 births
Living people
People from Gaborone
Botswana male sprinters
World Athletics Championships athletes for Botswana
Commonwealth Games competitors for Botswana
Athletes (track and field) at the 2014 Commonwealth Games
Athletes (track and field) at the 2018 Commonwealth Games
Athletes (track and field) at the 2011 All-Africa Games
Athletes (track and field) at the 2015 African Games
African Games competitors for Botswana